Edie Rodriguez is an American businesswoman and Member of the Board of Directors of various companies and works in executive leadership in the global luxury travel, technology, marketing and sales sectors. She is a Member of the Board of Directors of the Kingdom of Saudi Arabia Public Investment Fund's Saudi Tourism Authority where she is the Chairwoman of the Nominating and Remuneration Committee. Concurrently, she is a Member of the board of directors for publicly traded Gaucho Group Holdings, (NASDAQ - VINO) where she is Chairwoman of the Compensation Committee.

Previously, she was Ponant Cruise Line's Americas Brand Chairwoman and Corporate Special Advisor. Ponant is the world's leading luxury expedition cruise line with destinations to all seven continents and is owned by the multibillion-dollar Groupe Artémis.

From 2013 - 2017 Mrs. Rodriguez was CEO and President of Crystal Cruises where she strategically orchestrated the sale of the company for a then global cruise industry record breaking 15X EBITDA in 2015.

Early life and education
Rodriguez grew up in New York and New Jersey. She received a Bachelor of Science degree from Nova Southeastern University. She has also attended courses at Harvard, Stanford, and Wharton's School of Business Executive Management Programs.

Career

Rodriguez began her professional career as a travel consultant. From there she progressed to travel agency management positions before joining Amadeus (formerly known as System One), an IT Provider for the global travel and tourism industry. During her twelve-year tenure as vice president, she was head of the Global Cruise Line Division, for which she obtained and sustained a 90 percent global cruise line market share, making it Amadeus’ most profitable division.

Rodriguez has held senior executive positions with the world's two largest cruise line operators: Carnival Corporation (Carnival Cruise Lines) and Royal Caribbean Cruises Ltd. (RCL). She was senior vice president of marketing and sales at Azamara Club Cruises, the upmarket division of RCL. At Carnival Corporation, she served as vice president of business development and strategic partnerships and was a senior officer for Carnival Cruise Line and the Cunard and Seabourn brands.

In 2015, Rodriguez unveiled the blueprint for a major brand and fleet expansion for Crystal, which has been dubbed by the travel and hospitality industry as the largest expansion in history for any luxury brand. The unprecedented growth began with the launch of Crystal Yacht Expedition Cruises’ Crystal Esprit in December 2015, followed by Crystal Luxury Air, a private charter Bombardier Global Express Jet outfitted for just 12 guests in spring 2016, and Crystal Mozart, the first of a series of luxury river yachts in summer 2016.

Following the acquisition of Crystal Cruises by Genting Hong Kong in May 2015, she was promoted to CEO and President of Crystal Cruises and served in this capacity until September 2017.

Rodriguez was named EY Entrepreneur of the year Florida 2017, also recognized as a “Wave Maker” by Afar Magazine as one of ten visionaries making travel better  and selected as one of the most influential people in travel in 2016 by TravelPulse. Luxury Daily selected Rodriguez as one of its Luxury Women to Watch in 2017 for distinguishing herself as a difference maker in luxury travel, marketing, and digital sector.  Rodriguez sits on the board of directors for the Cruise Line Industry Association, Robb Report's Private Aviation Board, and Air France's advisory board for French Tourism.

Personal life
Edie married Tom Rodriguez, a Video Producer, in February 2014. She lives in South Florida and Tuscany, Italy. She has one grown son.

References

1961 births
Living people
Place of birth missing (living people)
American business executives
Nova Southeastern University alumni